American Forces usually refers to:
 Military of the United States

It may also refer to:
 Various American Christian militia movements, such as:
 Christian Patriot movement
 Christian Identity
 Constitutional militia movement
 American Forces, a fictional military organization in the 1998 movie Soldier